This is a list of Turkish-German authors or German-Turkish authors whose works add to German-Turkish literature. Some are writers for Turkish-German Cinema.

The writers belong to the Turkish group of immigrants in the German language area. Their works are part of Migrant literature and German present literature.

German language

A 
Taner Akçam
Doğan Akhanlı
Fatih Akın
Bülent Akinci
Sinan Akkuş
Yılmaz Arslan
Django Asül
Seyran Ateş

B 
 Tevfik Başer
 Habib Bektaş
 Şakir Bilgin

C 
Sabri Çakır
Neco Çelik
Bülent Ceylan
Zehra Çırak

D 
Bora Dağtekin
Güney Dal
Renan Demirkan

K 
Yadé Kara
Suzan Emine Kaube
Murat Kaya (writer)
Necla Kelek
Erden Kıral
Kemal Kurt
Nursel Köse

L 
Nuray Lale

M 
Erdal Merdan
Denis Moschitto

O 
Emine Sevgi Özdamar
Cem Özdemir

P 
Akif Pirinçci

U 
Şadi Üçüncü
Hüdai Ülker
İdil Üner

Y 
Kaya Yanar
Erol Yesilkaya
Şerafettin Yıldız

Z 
 Feridun Zaimoğlu

Turkish language 
Başar Sabuncu

Biographies
Murat Kurnaz

Literature 
 , in: Grenzüberschreitungen. Hg. von Manfred Durzak und Nilüfer Kuruyazycy, Königshausen & Neumann: Würzburg 2004, S. 71-91.
 Über das Leben in Bitterland : Bibliographie zur türkischen Deutschland-Literatur und zur türkischen Literatur in Deutschland. Zsgest. und mit zahlr. Annot. vers. von Wolfgang Riemann, Harrassowitz: Wiesbaden 1990

German people of Turkish descent
German-Turkish Authors